Bea is a municipality located in the Jiloca Comarca, province of Teruel, Aragon, Spain. According to the 2010 census the municipality has a population of 38 inhabitants.

Bea is located in the Sierra de Cucalón area.

See also
Jiloca Comarca
List of municipalities in Teruel

References

Municipalities in the Province of Teruel